Carlos Rodríguez (born 15 March 1939) is a Venezuelan boxer. He competed in the men's light welterweight event at the 1956 Summer Olympics.

References

1939 births
Living people
Venezuelan male boxers
Olympic boxers of Venezuela
Boxers at the 1956 Summer Olympics
Place of birth missing (living people)
Light-welterweight boxers